Amber Leigh Lancaster (born September 19, 1980) is an American model, actress and interior designer. She is best known for playing Jenny Swanson on MTVs The Hard Times of RJ Berger, as well as being a model on The Price Is Right.

Early life
Lancaster was born in Tacoma, Washington. She attended Franklin Pierce High School in Tacoma. In 1998, she won the title of Miss Washington Teen USA. She went on to join the Sea Gals, the cheerleading squad of the Seattle Seahawks football team. Lancaster was a member of the Sea Gals for five seasons before moving to Los Angeles to pursue her dancing and modeling career.

Career
In 2003, Lancaster was a regular dancer on the syndicated dance show Soul Train where she enjoyed a three-year stint until leaving in 2006. Lancaster appeared in the music video for Bo Bice's song "The Real Thing".

In 2007, she made an appearance at the 2007 Scream Awards.

In 2008, Lancaster joined the cast of The Price Is Right as one of the show's models.

In 2009, she was a trophy holder at the 61st Primetime Emmy Awards. 
Lancaster also appeared in the MTV comedy series The Hard Times of RJ Berger as Jenny Swanson.

Lancaster owns her own interior design business, Lancaster Interiors.

Personal life
On October 7, 2017, Lancaster married businessman A.J. Allodi in Palm Springs, California.

In April 2019, Lancaster announced she and Allodi were expecting their first child in October 2019. Lancaster developed preeclampsia during her pregnancy, which resulted in their son, Russ, being born two months early on August 3, 2019. In late-August Lancaster revealed she underwent a partial hysterectomy, the removal of her uterus, as a result of complications during the birth.

In September 2020, Lancaster announced her separation from Allodi.

In November 2021, Amber launched a clothing line with VICI Collection.

Filmography

References

External links
 
 The Cast: Amber Lancaster - Official Price Is Right Website

1980 births
Actresses from Tacoma, Washington
American television actresses
Game show models
Living people
National Football League cheerleaders
American cheerleaders
American beauty pageant winners
21st-century American women